ECAN may refer to:

 Établissement des Constructions et Armes Navales, a French institution for the procurement of equipment of the French Navy
 ECAN F17 – a type of French torpedo
 Echo cancellation – technology and processes for removing echo in voice telephony
 ECan, the promotional name for Environment Canterbury, the Canterbury Regional Council in New Zealand